Richard Henry Baker IV (July 8, 1897 – April 12, 1981) was bishop of the Episcopal Diocese of North Carolina, serving from 1959 to 1965.

Early life and education
Baker was born on July 8, 1897, in Norfolk, Virginia. He was educated at the Episcopal High School in Alexandria, Virginia and graduated from the University of Virginia with a B.A. and later enrolled in the Virginia Theological Seminary to study for the ordained ministry. Baker deployed as an ambulance driver on the French front lines during World War I and received the Croix de Guerre for his courageous service.

Ordained ministry
Baker was ordained deacon in June 1923 and priest in March 1924. His ministry commenced in Virginia and Louisiana. In 1931 he became rector of the Church of the Redeemer in Baltimore, where he remained until his episcopal election.

Episcopacy
In 1950, Baker was elected Coadjutor Bishop of North Carolina. He was consecrated in the Church of the Good Shepherd in Raleigh, North Carolina on January 25, 1951, by Presiding Bishop Henry Knox Sherrill. He became diocesan bishop in 1959. He retired in 1965 and moved to Baltimore.

Personal life
Baker married Elizabeth Lee Small and together had two children including the Reverend Richard H. Baker V.

References 

 

1897 births
1981 deaths
Recipients of the Croix de Guerre (France)
Episcopal Church in North Carolina
20th-century American Episcopalians
Episcopal bishops of North Carolina
20th-century American clergy